Rajan Sankaradi (6 November 19531 August 2016) was an Indian film director. He started his career as an assistant director under Balachandra Menon. He had directed the films Guruji Oru Vakku (1985), Meenathil Thalikettu (1998)  and Cleopatra (2013) with prominent actors like Mohanlal and Dileep playing the leads. He also worked as associate to several prominent Malayalam filmmakers including Sibi Malayil, Joshy, Fazil and K. Madhu. He is not related to late actor Sankaradi.

Filmography
Guruji Oru Vakku (1985)
Meenathil Thalikettu (1998)
Cleopatra (2013)

References

Malayalam film directors
1953 births
2016 deaths